Bogdan-Daniel Deac (born 8 October 2001) is a Romanian chess grandmaster. A chess prodigy, he earned his grandmaster title at the age of 14 years, 7 months and 27 days.

Chess career
Born in 2001, Deac earned his international master title in 2014 and his grandmaster title in 2016. He is the No. 1 ranked Romanian player as of December 2020. In March 2018, he competed in the European Individual Chess Championship. He placed ninety-fourth, scoring 6/11 (+4–3=4).

References

External links
 
  
 

2001 births
Living people
Chess grandmasters
Sportspeople from Râmnicu Vâlcea
Romanian chess players